Euvrilletta is a genus of death-watch and spider beetles in the family Ptinidae. There are about 14 described species in Euvrilletta.

Species
These 14 species belong to the genus Euvrilletta:

 Euvrilletta arizonica White, 1976 i c g
 Euvrilletta brunnea White, 1985 i c g
 Euvrilletta catalinae (Fall, 1905) i c g
 Euvrilletta distans (Fall, 1905) i c g
 Euvrilletta grossa (Van Dyke, 1946) i c g
 Euvrilletta harrisii (Fall, 1905) i c g b
 Euvrilletta hirsuta White, 1985 i c g
 Euvrilletta mucorea (LeConte, 1865) i c g b
 Euvrilletta occidentalis (Fall, 1905) i c g
 Euvrilletta peltata (Harris, 1836) i c g b (anobiid powderpost beetle)
 Euvrilletta sequoiae (Van Dyke, 1946) i c g
 Euvrilletta serricornis White, 1973 i c g
 Euvrilletta texana Van Dyke, 1946 i c g
 Euvrilletta xyletinoides Fall, 1905 i c g

Data sources: i = ITIS, c = Catalogue of Life, g = GBIF, b = Bugguide.net

References

Further reading

 
 
 
 
 

 
Bostrichiformia genera